Phước Bửu  is a township (Thị trấn) and town and capital of Xuyên Mộc District, Bà Rịa–Vũng Tàu province, in Vietnam.

It is located along National Route 55.

A nature reserve is located in the area.

Populated places in Bà Rịa-Vũng Tàu province
Communes of Bà Rịa-Vũng Tàu province
District capitals in Vietnam
Townships in Vietnam